Gigi Fernández and Robin White were the defending champions but did not compete that year.

Jill Hetherington and Elizabeth Smylie won in the final 6–1, 6–3 against Ann Henricksson and Beth Herr.

Seeds
Champion seeds are indicated in bold text while text in italics indicates the round in which those seeds were eliminated.

 Betsy Nagelsen /  Pam Shriver (first round)
 Jill Hetherington /  Elizabeth Smylie (champions)
 Ann Henricksson /  Beth Herr (final)
 Lea Antonoplis /  Cammy MacGregor (semifinals)

Draw

External links
 1989 Suntory Japan Open Tennis Championships Women's Doubles Draw

Doubles